Christine St. John (born 1954) is an American actress and playwright.

Career

St. John graduated in 1976 from the Goodman School of Drama of the Art Institute of Chicago. She further studied at Sorbonne University and with Atelier Blanche Salant and Paul Weaver at the The American Center for Art and Culture in Paris, from 1976 to 1977. She has worked continuously in the theatre over the past 50 years. 

In 2014, she wrote and performed her one-woman play: Bette Davis on The Edge. She toured her play from 2014 until 2019 in the USA, England, Singapore, Addis Ababa, and Off Broadway, New York City for United Solo Artists.

She and her husband, Cris Cole, are based in London.

References

1954 births
Living people

School of the Art Institute of Chicago alumni
Paris-Sorbonne University alumni
American actresses
American women dramatists and playwrights